Pears is a surname. Notable people with the surname include:

 Aynsley Pears (b. 1998), English footballer
 Andrew Pears (c. 1770 - 1845), originator of Pears soap
Bernard Pears, founder of the William Pears Group
 David Pears (1921-2009), British philosopher
 Edwin Pears (1835-1919), British barrister, author and historian
 Erik Pears (b. 1982), American football offensive tackle
 Harry Pears (1877-1912), Australian rules footballer
 Iain Pears (b. 1955), English writer and historian
Jeff Pears (1920–2003), English professional footballer
 Ken Pears (b. 1934),Canadian soccer goalkeeper
 Mark Pears (b. 1962), British businessman
 Peter Pears (1910-1986), English tenor
 Richard Pears (b. 1976), English footballer
 Stephen Pears (b. 1962), English footballer and goalkeeping coach
 Tayte Pears (b. 1990), Australian rules footballer
 Tim Pears (b. 1956), English novelist
 Trevor Pears (b. 1964), British businessman, grandson of Bernard

See also
 Pearse (surname)
 Piers (name)